Mysore Agarbathi is a variety of incense sticks manufactured at Mysore using locally grown ingredients which was found only in state of Karnataka before. This incense has been awarded  Geographical Indication tag from the Government of India in 2005 due to its historic background and remote availability of material used. Aptly, Mysore is also home to the world's largest manufacturer of agarbathi - N. Ranga Rao & Sons popularly known for the Cycle Pure Agarbathies .

History
The making of incense sticks, also called 'agarbathi' in Hindi, became an organised industry in Bangalore during the 1900s and was locally known as oodabathies (blowing fumes). The incense sticks were very simple to manufacture, as it was only a paste of natural ingredients mixed with charcoal and Gijit, and rolled on to bamboo sticks. The proportion of mixing was of main importance. Maharaja of Mysore was patronised the production and promotion of the incense sticks.
Mr T.l Updhayay from Thirithalli, Shimoga and Attar Khasim Sahib from Tanjavur started incense industry in Mysore in 1885. When they were given a certificate of merit from Wembley exhibition, London, the Mysore local government gave the incense sticks as gifts to visitors and guests from abroad to encourage exports to other countries.

Method of manufacturing
Herbs, flowers, Essential oil, barks, roots, charcoal are finely ground into smooth paste and then rolled on to a bamboo stick and then dried undersun, special wood like sandalwood, Ailanthus malabaricum which yields halmadi and other natural ingredients were geographically only available in Karnataka before which gives special geographical indications

Geographical Indication
The all India agarbhati association proposed the registration of Mysore Agarbathi under the Geographical Indications of Goods Act, 1999, to the Office of the Controller-General of Patents, Designs and Trademarks, Chennai, in order to make it exclusive the manufacturers of insence sticks who use only local available natural ingredients from the region to use the name Mysore. It was granted the Geographical Indication status, three years later, in 2005.

See also
 Mysore Sandalwood Oil
 Mysore Sandal Soap
 Mysore pak
 Navalgund Durries
 Coorg Green Cardamom
 List of Geographical Indications in India
 Incense Route
Kōdō, incense arts

References

Mysore
Geographical indications in Karnataka
Incense in India